The Río San Pedro is a river of Guatemala and Mexico. From there it continues northwest and joins the Usumacinta River. The river has red mangroves.

References

External links
Map of Guatemala including the river

Rivers of Guatemala
Geography of Mesoamerica
International rivers of North America
Rivers of Tabasco
Usumacinta River